Gary May could refer to: 

Gary May (footballer) (born 1967), English footballer
Gary S. May (born 1964), American academic and chancellor of the University of California, Davis